Harry Lynde Bradley (January 5, 1885 – July 23, 1965), the brother of Lynde Bradley, was the co-founder of the Allen-Bradley Company and the Lynde and Harry Bradley Foundation. He "became deeply involved in conservative causes", with "a strong sense of anti-communism animat[ing] his political beliefs". He was a founding member of the John Birch Society. He supported Robert A. Taft for the Presidency in 1952, and Barry Goldwater in 1964.

The Foundation, however, remained relatively small-scale until twenty years after Bradley's death, with the billion-dollar sale of Allen-Bradley to Rockwell Automation, which swelled the Foundation's assets from around $14m to around $290m.

His adopted daughter, Marion Bradley Via, lived in Virginia, and died in 1993. His daughter Jane Bradley Pettit, a philanthropist in Milwaukee, Wisconsin, died in 2001.

Books

References

External links
 From local roots, Bradley Foundation builds conservative empire
 Our founding families: Bradley Family

1885 births
1965 deaths
20th-century American businesspeople
John Birch Society members
Virginia Republicans
Businesspeople from Kansas City, Missouri